The 1992 European Judo Championships were held in Paris, France from 7 to 10 May 1992.

Medal overview

Men

Women

Medal table

References

External links
 

E
European Judo Championships
1992 in French sport
1992 in Paris
Europe
International sports competitions hosted by Paris
May 1992 sports events in Europe